Codorus Forge and Furnace Historic District, also known as Hellem (Hellam) Forge, is a historic iron forge and national historic district located at Hellam Township in York County, Pennsylvania. The district includes four contributing buildings, one contributing site, and one contributing structure.  The contributing buildings are the iron furnace (c. 1836), charcoal house (c. 1836), ruins of works' houses (c. 1836), ironmaster's house and furnace office (c. 1780), privy, forge (1800), and ruins of unknown structures. The furnace measures approximately 30 feet square at the base and 12 feet high. The ironmaster's house is a 2 1/2-story, stuccoed stone building, nine bays wide and one room deep.  The Hellem (Hellam) Forge was first established in 1765.

It was listed on the National Register of Historic Places in 1991.

References 

Industrial buildings and structures on the National Register of Historic Places in Pennsylvania
Historic districts on the National Register of Historic Places in Pennsylvania
Historic districts in York County, Pennsylvania
National Register of Historic Places in York County, Pennsylvania